Netball at the 2001 Southeast Asian Games was held at the Juara Stadium in Kuala Lumpur, Malaysia in September 2001. This is the first time netball was featured at the Southeast Asian Games.

Participating nations
Three nations are competed in netball at the 2001 Southeast Asian Games:

 
 
 

*  was set to participate but later withdrew from the netball tournament without playing a single match.

Preliminary round

Final
Malaysia won the netball event defeating Singapore in the final.

Final standing

References

2001
Netball
2001 in netball
International netball competitions hosted by Malaysia